Jawahar Navodaya Vidyalaya, Kannapurhatti, Raichur (JNVK) is a co-educational residential school near Mudgal, Raichur, India. JNVK is run and financed by Navodaya Vidyalaya Samiti, an autonomous body under the Ministry of Human Resource Development of the Government of India. JNV Raichur is affiliated to the Central Board for Secondary Education.

The school provides education to the talented children predominantly from rural areas. It functions under a scheme evolved by the government of India under which residential co-educational Navodaya Vidyalayas are being established on an average one in each district.

The classes run from VI to XII standard as per CBSE syllabus. The medium of instruction is English for Social Studies and Humanities, and English for Mathematics and Science.

Admission
Admission to JNV Raichur is based on an annual merit test, called the Jawahar Navodaya Vidyalaya Selection Test] (JNVST). The test is designed, developed and conducted by the CBSE, for class VI and for lateral admissions in the class IX and XI subject to available seats if any. The merit test is held as per policy of Navodya Vidyalaya Samiti.

Campus
School stands on a 33 acres (13 ha) campus near Kannapurhatti village, and also very near to Mudgal. The campus has several buildings, the administration Block, main class room buildings, Laboratory building, workshops, teachers' quarters, students' dormitories, principal's house, guest house, common mess, sports ground, Power house, water tank.

Migration
The Navodaya Vidyalaya scheme provides for migration of 30% children from the Vidyalayas located in Hindi belt to the Vidyalaya located in non-Hindi belt at class IX level. This school is having migration from JNV Panipat, Haryana. The school has a mini-migration system to the neighbouring cluster schools after class X where the students opt for continuing their study other than science stream.

References

External links
 http://www.jnvmudgal.gov.in
 https://web.archive.org/web/20150726233721/http://www.navodaya.nic.in/

Raichur
High schools and secondary schools in Karnataka
Schools in Raichur district
Educational institutions established in 1999
1999 establishments in Karnataka